Thomas Ahlström (17 July 1952) is a Swedish former professional footballer who played as a midfielder.

Thomas played for IF Elfsborg between 1971–1979 and 1982–84 and was the top scorer in Allsvenskan year 1983 with 16 goals. In 1979-82 he played in Olympiacos F.C., Greece. Thomas Ahlström was a member of the Swedish squad in the 1974 FIFA World Cup in Germany. He primarily was a midfielder, but could also play as a forward.

References

External links

1952 births
Living people
Swedish footballers
Sweden international footballers
1974 FIFA World Cup players
IF Elfsborg players
Olympiacos F.C. players
Expatriate footballers in Greece
Swedish expatriate sportspeople in Greece
Swedish expatriate footballers
Allsvenskan players
Super League Greece players
Association football midfielders
Association football forwards